Khit Thit Media is a news agency based in Myanmar (Burma). It is among the few independent news outlets in Myanmar.

History

Khit Thit Media was established on 1 January 2018 by Tharlun Zaung Htet, its editor-in-chief. Khit Thit Media has been subjected to repeated infringements on freedom of press. In February 2020, nationalists protested in front of Yangon City Hall, calling on Khit Thit Media to remove reporting on nationalist group activities. In March 2020, a police raid targeted its editor-in-chief and several journalists, for re-posting an interview with the spokesman of Arakan Army, an insurgent ethnic armed organisation in Rakhine State. In March 2021, following the 2021 Myanmar coup d'état, the military regime stripped Khit Thit, along with four other independent news agencies, of its media license for its ongoing coverage of anti-coup protests.

See also
Myanmar Now
Myanmar Times
Frontier Myanmar
The Irrawaddy

References

External links
 

Burmese news websites
News agencies based in Myanmar
2018 establishments in Myanmar
Mass media in Yangon